Stagecoach East is the divisional name for the bus operations of the Stagecoach Group in eastern England.

History
Under the control of the National Bus Company, Cambus Ltd. was set up when the Eastern Counties Omnibus Company was split in preparation for privatisation. The company was incorporated on 8 June 1984; it took over Eastern Counties' bus and National Express coach operations from garages in Cambridgeshire and parts of Suffolk (Newmarket and Haverhill) on 9 September 1984. On 5 December 1986, Cambus was sold to its management team, off-the-shelf company Minuteflush Ltd. being used for this purpose; Minuteflush Ltd. was renamed Cambus Holdings Ltd.

In September 1989, Cambus's Peterborough operations were split off to form The Viscount Bus and Coach Company Ltd., while in May 1990 Cambus Holdings acquired most of the bus and coach operations of Cambridge-based Premier Travel Services, the exception being the Cambridge–London Airports coach services, which remained with the AJS Group as part of the new Cambridge Coach Services operation (which retained the old Premier livery). A reorganisation followed on 20 May 1990, with all coach operations (including National Express contracts) being transferred to Premier Travel, and Premier Travel's stage bus routes being transferred to Cambus.

In February 1992, Cambus Holdings bought Millers Coaches of Foxton from its owner, Bernard Miller, on his retirement. Millers Coaches had been competing with Cambus on a number of bus routes, using the Millerbus name, and this operation became a new Millerbus Ltd. subsidiary, under the direct control of the Cambus management; the operation lasted for about three years before being absorbed into its parent. Meanwhile, Millers Coaches itself was placed under the control of Premier Travel, although the name was retained (and both companies adopted liveries using different colours applied in the same style). By the autumn of 1995, however, the operations of Premier Travel and Millers Coaches had been absorbed into the main Cambus company, although the Premier Travel name survived in use with Cambus a few years longer.

On 25 November 1992, Cambus Holdings expanded in Buckinghamshire, with the purchase of Generalouter Ltd., the holding company of Milton Keynes City Bus and Buckinghamshire Road Car - offshoots of former National Bus Company subsidiary United Counties.

Cambus Holdings was sold to the Stagecoach Group on 6 December 1995, being rebranded as Stagecoach Cambus before ultimately becoming the Stagecoach East division. However, following a report by the Monopolies and Mergers Commission, Stagecoach was required to divest itself of its Milton Keynes and Buckinghamshire operations, as well as United Counties' Huntingdon garage. In late 1997, new company MK Metro took over the Milton Keynes operations while Premier Buses took over the wider Buckinghamshire operations, both independent from Stagecoach. 

On 30 January 1998, the wider Buckinghamshire operations were sold to Sovereign Bus & Coach, owned by Blazefield Holdings. In November 2003 the operations were sold again from Blazefield to Cavalier Contracts of Long Sutton, Lincolnshire, trading as Huntingdon & District. The operations were acquired by Stagecoach on Monday 31 March 2008 when Cavalier Travel sold their interests in bus services of over 9 seats. At the date of sale operations were branded under the names Cavalier Travel and Huntingdon & District. In August 2010, the Stagecoach in Northants operation was transferred from Stagecoach East to Stagecoach Midlands.

As of 2021, Stagecoach East uses the brand names Stagecoach in Bedford for the former Cambus operations in Bedfordshire, Stagecoach in Cambridge for the former Cambus operations in Cambridgeshire, Stagecoach in Peterborough for the former Viscount operations and Stagecoach in the Fens for the former Huntingdon & District operations.

Liveries

The original Cambus livery was light (Cambridge) blue with an off-white stripe, applied in the standard National Bus Company style.  Dual purpose vehicles (Bristol REs) were light blue lower and cream upper, while coaches were cream and light blue with dark blue and light blue stripes (with those used on National Express work carrying full National Express colours).  The fleetname "CAMBUS", written in dark blue with wavy lines through it (to represent waterways), was applied in the usual place, accompanied by the National Bus Company double N logo for the first couple of years.

In 1986 a new livery was introduced, comprising dark blue, white and light blue (bottom to top), and including stripes on dual purpose vehicles and non-National Express coaches; this was soon followed by a new and bolder CAMBUS logo, written in a less fussy style.  The strap line "It's much less fuss" was added later.  In 1990 one single-deck dual purpose vehicle gained a maroon and light blue livery with a "CAMCOACH" logo, but this was not continued.

With the spinning off of Peterborough services under the Viscount brand of Cambus Holdings, a livery of yellow and white with blue and grey stripes was introduced for this operation. Later there was also a Peterborough Bus Company version of the livery, using red and cream.

Following the Stagecoach takeover, standard Stagecoach livery was applied to the fleet, with "Stagecoach Cambus" branding.  The current Stagecoach livery with "Stagecoach in Cambridge" fleetnames appeared later.  Vehicles used on Park and Ride services in Cambridge wear special liveries (there have been a variety), as do guided buses for use on The Busway; there have also been special liveries for certain other services.

In early 2020, Stagecoach rebranded including a new logo and new liveries. Vehicles within Stagecoach East starting being painted into the new "Local" livery in late 2020.

Services
Stagecoach East are one of the two bus companies operating services on The Cambridgeshire Guided Busway the other  being Transit Systems subsidiary Whippet Coaches. Buses for this service are operated under the Busway or Biobus brands.

The X5 service operates between Bedford and Oxford via Milton Keynes, Buckingham and Bicester, and uses ADL Enviro 400MMC double deckers. Previously the service ran coaches, with the previous generation being Plaxton bodied Volvo B11R coaches. The X5 runs up to every 30 minutes most days. Until late August 2020, this service ran through to Cambridge but no longer does so; this leg is provided by a new 905 route.
To assist the elderly and disabled, all routes have low-floor buses.

The company carries over six million passengers per year, and its buses cover over 6 million miles.

In 2021, in cooperation with the Combined Authority, Stagecoach began operation of 'Ting', a DRT system in West Huntingdonshire. The service is run by Fenstanton Depot.

Depots

Stagecoach East currently operates from four main depots, as detailed below.

Bedford (St Johns Street)
Cambridge (Cowley Road)
Fenstanton (Cambridge Road)
Peterborough (Lincoln Road)

The former Bedford outstation at Biggleswade closed in early 2018.

See also
List of bus operators of the United Kingdom
 Milton Keynes Coachway

References

External links
Stagecoach East website
Stagecoach X5 and 905 website
Information about services on The Busway

Transport in Cambridge
Transport in Peterborough
Bus operators in Cambridgeshire
Stagecoach Group bus operators in England
Bus operators in Bedfordshire
Transport in Bedford
Flitwick
Borough of Bedford